Suzanne Margaret "Sue" Basso ( Burns; May 15, 1954 – February 5, 2014) was an American woman who was one of six co-defendants convicted in the August 1998 torture and murder of Louis "Buddy" Musso, a mentally disabled man who was killed for his life insurance money. She was sentenced to death in October 1999. Basso was executed by lethal injection on February 5, 2014. Prior to her execution, Basso had been held at the Mountain View Unit in Gatesville, Texas, where all of the state's female death row inmates are incarcerated. At the time of the crime, Basso lived in Jacinto City, Texas, a Houston suburb.

Victim
Buddy Musso had been married previously and had a son with his wife, who died of cancer in 1980. In 1997, Musso was living in an assisted living house in Cliffside Park, New Jersey, near New York City, and worked as a bagger at a ShopRite store. At age 58, he met Suzanne Basso, who was 43 at the time, at a church bazaar near his house. They started a long-distance relationship and he planned to move to Texas with Basso. He moved to the Houston area on June 14, 1998.

Basso's life
Suzanne Basso was born on May 15, 1954, to a family from Schenectady, New York. She was one of eight children born to Florence (née Garrow) and John Richard Burns. Her mother was the elder sister of spree killer Robert Garrow. Suzanne was the youngest of three girls in the family. Suzanne was physically and sexually abused as a child. One story among the family is that when Suzanne's mother caught her with a pack of cigarettes, instead of making her smoke one, she made her eat them.

She married a Marine named James Peek in the early 1970s. Her name became "Sue Peek" as a result of her marriage. Sue Peek's daughter was born in 1973, and her son was born in 1974. James Peek was arrested in 1982 for molesting his daughter and was convicted of taking indecent liberties with a child. In the early 1990s, James and Sue Peek and the children moved into a residence in Houston. The family changed their surname to O'Malley and adopted an Irish-American identity. While in Houston she sometimes worked as a security guard in an apartment complex.

In 1993, Sue Peek became romantically involved with a New Jersey man named Carmine Basso, who owned a company called Latin Security and Investigations Corp. She never divorced James Peek, so was unable to marry Basso, who moved into her residence. Peek stayed in the house for a period before moving to another residence in Houston. Despite being unable to marry Basso, she changed her surname to Basso and began referring to Basso as her husband. Basso died in 1997.

Murder
Musso's murder took place 16 days after his arrival at the Basso residence. The perpetrators included Basso; her son James O'Malley; Bernice Ahrens Miller and her children, Craig and Hope Ahrens; and Hope's fiancé, Terence Singleton. The perpetrators forced Musso to do chores for them and he had injuries before his murder took place. According to O'Malley, Musso was killed at Miller's apartment, where he was beaten and burned with cigarettes as he sat on a child's play mat. The group also used a wire brush on him, then put him in a bathtub that was filled with kitchen cleaner and bleach. They put clothes on Musso's body before leaving it in Galena Park, Texas. A jogger found the body and called police. The Galena Park Police Department ruled that Musso's death was due to "multiple blunt impact trauma."

Trial, sentencing, and death

Mary Lou Keel, a Texas district judge, established that most of the suspects would get individual trials. The prosecutors were Colleen Barnett and Denise Nassar. The trial of O'Malley was scheduled to begin on April 13, 1999. Craig Ahrens' trial was scheduled to begin later that month. Miller and Singleton were to be tried together during a trial beginning in May. The trial for Hope Ahrens was scheduled for June. The final trial, that of Basso, was scheduled for July.

O'Malley was convicted of capital murder and received a life sentence. Miller was convicted of murder and received 80 years in prison. Craig Ahrens was convicted of murder and received 60 years in prison. Singleton was convicted of capital murder and received a life sentence. The trial of Hope Ahrens resulted in a hung jury, but she took a plea deal in exchange for testifying against Basso. She received a 20-year sentence and has since been released from prison. Suzanne Basso was convicted and sentenced to death. Basso was held at the Texas Department of Criminal Justice (TDCJ) Mountain View Unit in Gatesville while on death row.

Since Texas no longer serves last meal requests on death row, Basso ate regular prison fare of baked chicken, fish, boiled eggs, carrots, green beans, and sliced bread. She was executed on February 5, 2014, at the Huntsville Unit of the TDCJ. When asked if she had a last statement, she replied to the prison warden, "No, sir." She was pronounced dead at 6:26 p.m. CST, 11 minutes after a lethal dose of the drug pentobarbital was administered.

, the other perpetrators are incarcerated at these prisons:
 James O'Malley: Hodge Unit
 Bernice Ahrens: Hobby Unit
 Craig Ahrens: Ferguson Unit
 Hope Ahrens: Lockhart Unit
 Terence Singleton: Ferguson Unit

Statistics 
As a result of the 1976 U.S. Supreme Court decision in Gregg v. Georgia, capital punishment was reinstated in the United States. With her execution, Basso became:

 the 14th woman executed in the U.S. since 1976
 the seventh murderer executed in the U.S. in 2014
 the 1,366th murderer executed in the U.S. since 1976
 the second murderer executed in Texas in 2014
 the 510th murderer executed in Texas since 1976

See also
 Capital punishment in Texas
 List of people executed in Texas, 2010–2019
 List of people executed in the United States in 2014
 List of women executed in the United States since 1976

References

Further reading
Media releases:
 

Legal documents:
"IN THE COURT OF CRIMINAL APPEALS OF TEXAS NO. 73,672 SUSAN (a.k.a. SUZANNE) MARGARET BASSO, Appellant v. THE STATE OF TEXAS APPEAL FROM HARRIS COUNTY" (Archive)

Newspaper articles: (Houston Chronicle articles are available from the Houston Public Library, accessible with a library card)
Rendon, Ruth. "6 charged in death of mentally impaired man; police say broken ornament led to fatal beating." Houston Chronicle. August 28, 1998.
Crocker, Ronnie and Kevin Moran. "Inquiry grows as beating-death case takes odd twist; suspect was featured in bogus wedding ad." Houston Chronicle, August 29, 1998.
Mosk, Matthew. "A Lonely Man's Betrayal and Death." Bergen Record. August 30, 1998. See clipping from Newspapers.com
Crocker, Ronnie and Ruth Rendon. "Suspect's life packed with eccentricities; Sue Basso, held in killing, has left a long, strange trail." Houston Chronicle. September 6, 1998.
Rendon, Ruth. "Slaying possibly tied to insurance' victim's policy paid off extra if he died from violent crime." Houston Chronicle. September 17, 1998.
Brewer, Steve. "Prosecutors weigh death penalty in savage beating case." Houston Chronicle. December 10, 1998.
Brewer, Steve. "Prosecutor tells of torture, false lure of love." Houston Chronicle. April 16, 1999
Brewer, Steve. "Defendant tries to blame mother for his role in man's death." Houston Chronicle. April 20, 1999
Brewer, Steve. "Mother, son tried to downplay their roles in torture, killing." Houston Chronicle. May 6, 1999
Brewer, Steve. "Mother, son sentenced for murder; jury delivers long terms in torture-slaying case." Houston Chronicle, May 11, 1999.
Brewer, Steve. "Suspect in fatal torture case puts most of blame on others." Houston Chronicle. May 15, 1999.
"MAN GETS LIFE IN PRISON FOR ROLE IN TORTURE SLAYING." The Buffalo News. May 21, 1999.
Brewer, Steve. "Dispatcher says slaying suspect wasn't remorseful when confessing." Houston Chronicle. June 9, 1999.
Brewer, Steve. "Witnesses in Basso murder trial say victim refused offers of help." Houston Chronicle. August 19, 1999.
Brewer, Steve. "Basso admitted role in beatings, jury told." Houston Chronicle. August 20, 1999.
Brewer, Steve. "Victim's handwritten plea for help read to jury in Basso murder trial." Houston Chronicle. August 25, 1999.
Brewer, Steve. "Convicted murderer abuses her kids, preys on weak, jurors told." Houston Chronicle. August 31, 1999.
Brewer, Steve. "Basso weeps at hearing death sentence; daughter cries tears of joy over punishment in mother's plot to kill." Houston Chronicle. September 2, 1999.
McGraw, Seamus. "Cowboy Boots, a Scarf, and a Fatal Attraction: Cliffside Park Man's Killer Sentenced to Death." Bergen Record. September 3, 1999. Available at HighBeam Research. Clipping at Newspapers.com.
Brewer, Steve. "Childhood of Indignities: Basso's daughter tells of abuse by her mother." Houston Chronicle. September 5, 1999.
Zuniga, Jo Ann. "Woman pleads guilty, gets 20 years in Musso murder." Houston Chronicle. October 29, 1999.
Turner, Allan. "Courts reject 3 Suzanne Basso appeals as death date approaches." Houston Chronicle. Monday February 3, 2014.
Graczyk, Michael. "Woman set to be executed in Texas for 1998 killing." Associated Press. February 5, 2014. Available at HighBeam Research.

1954 births
2014 deaths
20th-century American women
21st-century American women
People from Schenectady, New York
American people executed for murder
American female murderers
People convicted of murder by Texas
1998 murders in the United States
21st-century executions by Texas
People executed by Texas by lethal injection
Executed American women
21st-century executions of American people
20th-century American criminals